Grjúpán is an Icelandic dish that was eaten in earlier centuries in Iceland. It consisted of the lungs of a sheep which was smoked with added salt and water.

The word "Grjúpán" has also long been used as a synonym of another kind of mutton sausage, bjúga , in Iceland.

See also

 List of lamb dishes
 List of smoked foods

References
Gísladóttir, Hallgerður  (1999), Íslensk matarhefð, Reykjavík

Icelandic cuisine
Offal
Lamb dishes
Smoked meat